Orlando Sirola (30 April  1928 – 13 November 1995) was a male tennis player from Italy.

Biography
Sirola was born in Fiume, today the Croatian city of Rijeka. He only began playing tennis at the age of 22. 

In 1958 he won the singles title at the Bavarian Tennis Championships in Munich after a five-set victory in the final against Luis Ayala.

Sirola's best result in a Grand Slam singles event was at Roland Garros in 1960, where he reached the semifinals. He also won the Roland Garros doubles title in 1959, partnering Nicola Pietrangeli. He was a member of the Italian teams which finished runners-up to Australia in the Davis Cup in 1960 and 1961.

Grand Slam finals

Doubles (1 title, 2 runners-up)

External links 
 
 
 

1928 births
1995 deaths
Italian male tennis players
People from Rijeka
Grand Slam (tennis) champions in men's doubles
Mediterranean Games bronze medalists for Italy
Mediterranean Games medalists in tennis
Competitors at the 1963 Mediterranean Games
French Championships (tennis) champions
20th-century Italian people